Al Yarmuk Al Rawda is a Yemeni professional football club based in San‘a’. Founded in 1978, the club competes in the Yemeni League.

Achievements
Yemeni League: 3
1989, 1990, 2013
Yemeni Super Cup: 0
Runners-up: 2014

Performance in AFC competitions
AFC Cup: 1 appearance
2014: Qualifying play-off

Managerial history
Last update: 21 February 2014.
 Mohammed Nfaiei (ca. 2014–)

References

Football clubs in Yemen
Association football clubs established in 1978
1978 establishments in Yemen